Jean-Marc Chaput (6 November 1930 – 6 June 2020) was a Canadian public speaker and author.

Biography
The son of Robert Chaput and Gladys Reid, Jean-Marc Chaput spent his childhood on 4e Avenue, between Rue Masson and Saint Joseph Boulevard. He attended Collège Ahuntsic, Collège Sainte-Marie de Montréal, and HEC Montréal. On 14 February 1953, he married Céline Graton at Saint-Nicolas d'Ahuntsic in Montreal. The couple had five children: Patrick, François, Isabelle, Pierre-Yves, and Geneviève. They also had 21 grandchildren.

Chaput died on 6 June 2020 in Montreal due to bone cancer at the age of 89.

Publications
À la recherche de l'humain, une recherche du bonheur et de nos possibilités (1988)
Politiquement incorrect (2006)
À la recherche de l'humain (2007)
Une vie d'amour et d'épreuves (2011)

References

1930 births
2020 deaths
Deaths from bone cancer
Deaths from cancer in Quebec
French Quebecers
Public orators
Writers from Montreal
20th-century Canadian male writers
21st-century Canadian male writers